The 1851 Vermont gubernatorial election was held on September 2, 1851. The state continued its support for the Whig party, and Whig Governor Charles K. Williams was easily re-elected to a one-year term. The strong showing of the Free Soil Party candidate Timothy P. Redfield also showed that Vermont was on its way to becoming an anti-slavery bastion. The Democratic nominee, John S. Robinson went on to win the governorship in 1853.

Results

References

1851
Vermont
Gubernatorial
October 1851 events